The 2023–24 Premier League will be the 32nd season of the Premier League, and the 125th season of top-flight English football overall. The fixtures will be announced on Wednesday 14 June 2023 at 09:00 BST.

Teams
Twenty teams will compete in the league – the top seventeen teams from the previous season and the three teams promoted from the Championship. As of 4 March 2023, two of the seventeen returning teams have been determined, as they have earned sufficient points to guarantee they will not be relegated.

Stadiums and locations

 Note: Table lists in alphabetical order.

Personnel and kits

League table

Results

References

 
Premier League seasons
1
England
England